The Schiller Institute is a German based political and economic think tank founded by Helga Zepp-LaRouche, with stated members in 50 countries. It is among the principal organizations of the LaRouche movement. The institute's stated aim is to apply the ideas of the poet and philosopher Friedrich Schiller to what it calls the "contemporary world crisis." Their constitution, adopted in 1984, rails against international financial institutions and other supranational bodies, without naming any, for causing a state of tyranny in the world, especially amongst developing nations.

The website of the Schiller Institute includes transcripts of conferences that the institute has sponsored, throughout North and South America, Europe, Asia, Africa and Australia, to promote the idea of what it calls "peace through development". The discussion at these conferences centers around LaRouche's proposals for infrastructure projects such as the "Eurasian Land Bridge", and the "Oasis Plan", a Middle East peace agreement based on Arab-Israeli collaboration on major water projects, as well as proposals for debt relief and a sweeping reorganization of the world monetary system. The Institute strongly opposes the "Clash of Civilizations" thesis of Samuel Huntington, counter-posing what it calls a "Dialogue of Cultures". They evince support for President Trump, who they claim is being ousted in a "seditious coup" as well as the Chinese leader Xi Jinping and the New Silk Road and Belt and Road initiatives, which they see as "shared mutually beneficial and balanced development.

Allegations of antisemitism arose in 2003 following the death of Jeremiah Duggan, a student who had been attending their conference in Germany. The Schiller Institute was accused of spreading antisemitic conspiracy theories. An internal London Metropolitan Police (Scotland Yard) letter, obtained by the BBC's Newsnight during a British investigation into the death says: "The Schiller Institute and the LaRouche Youth Movement... blames the Jewish people for the Iraq war and all the other problems in the world. Jeremiah's lecture notes and bulletins showed the antisemitic nature of [the] ideology." The German newspaper Berliner Zeitung categorizes the Schiller Institute as antisemitic.

They also publish quarterly magazines, such as Fidelio, which is described as a "Journal of Poetry, Science, and Statecraft", and Ibykus, named after Schiller's poem "The Cranes of Ibykus."

Ties to the LaRouche movement 

The Schiller Institute is closely tied to Lyndon LaRouche. The institute's website states that "[i]t is his work and his ideas, [which] inspired the creation of the international Schiller Institute, as well as his intellectual and moral leadership that continue to set the standard for the policies and activity of the movement." LaRouche's writings are featured prominently in Schiller Institute communications. Before his death in 2019, LaRouche was the keynote speaker at most of the Schiller Institute's conferences.

Founding and stated aims
The institute was founded at a conference in Wiesbaden, Germany, in 1984 by Helga Zepp-LaRouche, the German-born wife of American political activist Lyndon LaRouche. Its stated aim is to seek to apply the ideas of poet, dramatist and philosopher Friedrich Schiller to the current global political situation. They emphasize Schiller's concept of the interdependence of classical artistic beauty and republican political freedom, as elaborated in his series of essays entitled Letters on the Aesthetical Education of Man.

On November 26, 1984, the institute released a "Declaration of the Inalienable Rights of Man," which it describes as "the basis of the Institute's work and efforts worldwide." It states in part:

Zepp-LaRouche has explained the need for the Schiller Institute as follows:

Among the past and present members of the institute's board of directors are Helga Zepp-LaRouche, Webster Tarpley, Civil rights leader Amelia Boynton Robinson, former South Carolina State Assemblyman Theo Mitchell, classical singer William Warfield, former Guyanese Foreign Minister Frederick Wills, physicist Winston H. Bostick, and former Borough President of Manhattan Hulan Jack. Among the founding members of the institute were Hulan Jack and French Resistance leader Marie-Madeleine Fourcade.

Political activity
The website of the Schiller Institute includes transcripts of conferences that the institute has sponsored, throughout North and South America, Europe, Asia, Africa and Australia, to promote the idea of what it calls "peace through development". The discussion at these conferences has generally centered around LaRouche's proposals for infrastructure projects such as the "Eurasian Land Bridge", and the "Oasis Plan", a Middle East peace agreement based on Arab-Israeli collaboration on major water projects. The conferences also typically discuss proposals for debt relief and the "New Bretton Woods," a proposal for a sweeping reorganization of the world monetary system (see Political views of Lyndon LaRouche). The Institute strongly opposes the "Clash of Civilizations" thesis of Samuel Huntington, counterposing what it calls a "Dialogue of Cultures".

According to the Executive Intelligence Review, LaRouche formed a group called the "Committee to Save the Presidency" to fight the international financiers who he said were behind an attempted coup against President Bill Clinton. Schiller Institute members are reported to have collected petition signatures defending Clinton, and picketed the U.S. Capitol in 1999 with signs that said "Save the Presidency! Jail Kenneth 'Porno' Starr". A Schiller Institute spokesperson said "This is a coup to overthrow the United States government and disenfranchise the American electorate".

The March 18, 2007 internet edition of the Danish newspaper Jyllands-Posten reported the Schiller Institute proposal for a national Maglev train system in Denmark. In the 2007 Danish elections there were four candidates for parliament affiliated with the Schiller Institute. They received 197 votes nationwide (while at least 32,000 are needed for a local mandate). The candidates garnered press coverage, including an interview with Tom Gillesberg in Berlingske Tidende, which discussed the slogan of the LaRouche slate, "After the financial crash, Maglev over Kattegat.".

During Fall of 2007, Schiller Institute Vice President Amelia Boynton Robinson toured the nations of Sweden, Denmark, Germany, France and Italy, during which she spoke with European youth about her support for LaRouche, Martin Luther King Jr., and Franklin Delano Roosevelt, as well as the continuing problem of racism in the United States, which she said was illustrated by the recent events in Jena, Louisiana.

In March 2009, the Danish branch of the institute distributed flyers at a climate change conference in Copenhagen which asserted that 'British Climate lies will lead to Genocide', stating that the Bush administration had been a puppet of the British Empire, that "solar activity, not human activity, is the main factor in the Earth's changing climate," and that "massive investment in windmills and solar panels" to combat climate change would create genocide by raising the price of food.

Cultural activity

Fidelio
The institute has published its quarterly magazine, Fidelio, since 1992, described as a "Journal of Poetry, Science, and Statecraft." It was co-founded and edited by Kenneth Kronberg. The magazine is named after Ludwig van Beethoven's opera, Fidelio, which tells the story of a political prisoner who is freed by the courage of his wife. At the time the magazine was founded, Lyndon LaRouche was still in prison.

Its issues have included articles on Homer, Henry VII, Benjamin Franklin, Gottfried Leibniz, the Vier ernste Gesänge of Johannes Brahms, Vice President Dick Cheney, Paul Kreingold's “I.L. Peretz, Father of the Yiddish Renaissance”, and reviews of books, art exhibits, and musical, and dramatic performances.

Verdi tuning

In 1988, the institute initiated a campaign to establish "philosophical pitch" or "scientific pitch" as the classical music concert pitch standard. This tuning system is based on middle C set at 256 Hz, making concert A 430.539 Hz rather than the most commonly used 440 Hz. The Schiller Institute calls this system "Verdi tuning" because it was Italian composer Giuseppe Verdi who first sought to stop the increase in pitch to which orchestras are tuned. However, Verdi used the French standard 435 Hz in writing his Requiem in 1874; later he indicated that 432 Hz was slightly more optimal. It is this A=432 Hz standard that the Schiller Institute advocates, which aligns mathematically with their stated preference for C=256 Hz as long as Pythagorean tuning is used (in equal temperament or just intonation, A would be 430.541 Hz or 426.667 Hz, respectively). French acoustic physicist Joseph Sauveur first researched then proposed the philosophical pitch standard in 1713, more than a century before Verdi began leading orchestras. Sauveur was strongly resisted by the musicians he was working with, and the proposed standard was not adopted.

In 1999, the institute circulated a petition calling for the establishment of a permanent orchestra in Verdi's childhood home in Busseto, Italy, employing the special tuning in order to mark the composer's centennial.

The tuning initiative is opposed by Stefan Zucker. According to Zucker, the Institute offered a bill in Italy to impose the Verdi tuning on state-sponsored musicians that included provisions for fines and confiscation of non-Verdi tuning forks. Zucker has written that he believes the claims about the Verdi tuning are historically inaccurate. Institute followers are reported by Tim Page of Newsday to have stood outside concert halls with petitions to ban the music of Vivaldi and even to have disrupted a concert conducted by Leonard Slatkin in order to pass out pamphlets titled "Leonard Slatkin Serves Satan."

Other music initiatives
In 1992, the institute published A Manual on the Rudiments of Tuning and Registration: Book I: Introduction and Human Singing Voice, which discusses the tuning issue from the artistic and the scientific point of view. The Institute asserts the Bel Canto method of singing is "one of the best examples of mankind's ability to discover an existing physical principle, and to use that discovery to create new works of science and art, which then increase humanity's power to build civilization." They also assert that composers such as J.S. Bach, Wolfgang Amadeus Mozart, Ludwig van Beethoven, and Giuseppe Verdi all wrote with the distinct vocal registers of the Bel Canto system in mind, and that their compositions intentionally exploit the different tone colors that these registers produce.

In 2010, 25 LaRouche supporters protesting a new production of Richard Wagner's Der Ring des Nibelungen presented by the Los Angeles Opera carried signs that said, "Wagner: Loved by Nazis, Rejected by Humans" and "L.A. County: $14 Million to promote Nazi Wagner, Layoffs for Music Teachers". They distributed flyers from the Schiller Institute which asked "Does Los Angeles County have nothing better to do ... than bail out L.A. Opera, so that it can celebrate the monstrous sexual fantasies, and the cult of violence, of that vile anti-Semite, Wagner?"

The Schiller Institute presented a performance of Mozart's Requiem at the Cathedral of the Holy Cross in Boston, on January 19, 2014, the 50th anniversary of the performance of Mozart's Requiem and pontifical mass for John F. Kennedy which was held at the Cathedral. Remarks were made by Ambassador Ray Flynn, and a letter was read from Irish President Michael D. Higgins. Recordings of speeches by President Kennedy were also featured.

Drama and poetry
The institute has published a four-volume series of English translations of the works of Friedrich Schiller, entitled Poet of Freedom, as well as some translations into other languages.

Criticism

Allegations of antisemitism

Following the 2003 death of Jeremiah Duggan, a student who had been attending a Schiller Institute conference in Germany, the Schiller Institute was accused of spreading antisemitic conspiracy theories. An internal London Metropolitan Police (Scotland Yard) letter, obtained by the BBC's Newsnight during a British investigation into the death says: "The Schiller Institute and the LaRouche Youth Movement... blames the Jewish people for the Iraq war and all the other problems in the world. Jeremiah's lecture notes and bulletins showed the antisemitic nature of [the] ideology." The German newspaper Berliner Zeitung categorizes the Schiller Institute as antisemitic.

Duggan had been attending a Schiller Institute conference and LaRouche Youth Movement cadre school in Wiesbaden, Germany, when he died after running onto a busy road. The German police investigation found that he had committed suicide. A British inquest rejected that verdict after hearing testimony about the nature of the Schiller Institute.

In an interview with Newsnight, Chip Berlet of Political Research Associates, an American research group that tracks right-wing movements, said:

The Schiller Institute issued a statement in response to the controversy, calling it "a politically motivated smear job" based on "conspiracy theories," and alleged that the Institute was being targeted because of its opposition to the Iraq War.

Cult allegations
Following the 2003 death of Duggan, cult allegations were made. According to the Berliner Zeitung, the LaRouche movement in Germany, operating as the Schiller Institute, LaRouche Youth Movement, Europäische Arbeiterpartei and Bürgerrechtsbewegung Solidarität (BüSo), had around 300 followers in 2007, and "next to Scientology, [was] the cult soliciting most aggressively in German streets at [that] time."

The BBC's Newsnight has said the institute places members under "psychological duress," during "so-called psycho sessions." Aglaja Beyes Corleis, a member of the Schiller Institute for 16 years, who left in the early 1990s and wrote a book about the Institute, told the BBC:

On November 6, 2003, a British inquest heard allegations that the Schiller Institute is a
"political cult with sinister and dangerous connections." which may have used controversial recruitment techniques on Duggan.

Death of Kenneth Kronberg

Kenneth Kronberg, co-founder and editor of the Schiller Institute's magazine, Fidelio, and the president of a LaRouche movement printing business, committed suicide in April 2007. According to Nicholas F. Benton, a former member of the LaRouche movement, Kronberg killed himself on the day that a so-called "morning briefing" (published daily by the LaRouche movement) heavily criticized Kronberg's printing business. Kronberg's printing business was also reported to be in financial trouble, the Washington Monthly described the companies finances as being "in perilous shape. Various LaRouche organizations owed Kronberg hundreds of thousands of dollars. When the IRS and Virginia tax authorities came calling over withholding payments, Ken knew he was in serious trouble."

Russian invasion of Ukraine
During the 2022 Russian invasion of Ukraine, the Schiller Institute argued for Russia to be relieved of economic sanctions, for other countries to cease supporting Ukraine, and for Ukraine to surrender territory and to accede to Russia's demands. The Ukrainian government Center for Countering Disinformation named the Schiller Institute as one of several entities it says conspired with Russia in advancing propaganda efforts in support of the war.

Conferences
These are highlights of conferences from the Schiller Institute's 20-year history.

Nov. 1–3, 1985: "Saint Augustine, Father of European and African Civilization"Rome, Italy
Labor Day conference, 1986, featuring a performance of Mozart's Requiem at C=256 Hz, with Schiller chorus and orchestraReston, Virginia, U.S.
Nov. 22–23, 1990: "The Productive Triangle: Centerpiece of an All-Eurasian Infrastructure Program, Locomotive for a New, Just World Economic Order"Berlin, Germany
April 26–30, 1993: International conference on religions sponsored by the government of SudanKhartoum
Aug. 7–14, 1994: Educational-cultural seminar for young musicians and artists, featuring Norbert Brainin, Lyndon LaRouche, and Helga Zepp LaRoucheSmolenice Castle, Slovakia
July 17, 1997: Presentation by Dr. Jozef Miklosko, president of the Slovakian branch of the Schiller Institute and former vice premier of post-communist Czechoslovakia Manila, Philippines
Dec. 13, 2000: Memorial seminar for Russian Schiller Institute leader Taras V. MuranivskyMoscow, Russia

Notes

Further reading
Helmut Lorscheid, Leo A Mueller: Deckname: Schiller : die deutschen Patrioten des Lyndon LaRouche (in German). Rowohlt, 1986.

External links
Schiller Institute website

Political and economic think tanks in the United States
Political and economic think tanks based in Germany
LaRouche movement
Friedrich Schiller